The 2014 Italian Figure Skating Championships was held at the Meranarena in Merano from December 18 through 21, 2013. Medals were awarded in the disciplines of men's singles, ladies' singles, pair skating, ice dancing, and synchronized skating on the senior and junior levels. The results are among the criteria used to choose Italy's teams for ISU Championships.

Senior results

Men

Ladies

Pairs

Ice dancing

Synchronized

Junior results

Men

Ladies

Pairs

Ice dancing

Synchronized

References

External links
 Announcement
 2014 Italian Championships results
 Federazione Italiana Sport del Ghiaccio (Italian Ice Sports Federation)

Italian Figure Skating Championships
2013 in figure skating
Figure Skating Championships, 2014